Charles Edward Smith IV (born November 29, 1967) is an American former professional basketball player who played with the Boston Celtics and Minnesota Timberwolves in the National Basketball Association (NBA). Smith was also a member of the bronze medal-winning 1988 United States Olympic team and was an All-American college player at Georgetown.

College career
Smith was born in Washington, D.C., where he attended All Saints High School. At Georgetown University he was the Big East Men's Basketball Player of the Year for the 1988–89 season.

Smith also played for the 1988 United States Men's Olympic Basketball Team, the last American team not to feature NBA players.

Professional career
After his college career, Smith went undrafted during the 1989 NBA draft, but he went on to play for the Boston Celtics and the Minnesota Timberwolves.

Conviction of vehicular homicide
On March 12, 1992, Smith was convicted of vehicular homicide and leaving the scene of a crime, in the hit-and-run deaths of two Boston University students on March 22, 1991. He subsequently served time in prison.

Shooting
On October 21, 2010, Smith was shot twice in the chest at his home in Bowie, Maryland. Smith underwent surgery and survived. The next day, police discovered "large quantity of cocaine and evidence of a gambling operation" in a search of his home.

References

1967 births
Living people
All-American college men's basketball players
American expatriate basketball people in Argentina
American expatriate basketball people in Belgium
American expatriate basketball people in Greece
American expatriate basketball people in Italy
American expatriate basketball people in Serbia
American expatriate basketball people in Spain
American men's basketball players
American people convicted of manslaughter
American shooting survivors
American sportspeople convicted of crimes
Archbishop Carroll High School (Washington, D.C.) alumni
Basket Napoli players
Basketball players at the 1988 Summer Olympics
Basketball players from Washington, D.C.
Boston Celtics players
Club Ourense Baloncesto players
Connecticut Pride players
Florida Beachdogs players
Georgetown Hoyas men's basketball players
Hartford Hellcats players
Iraklis Thessaloniki B.C. players
KK Crvena zvezda players
La Crosse Bobcats players
Liège Basket players
Liga ACB players
Medalists at the 1988 Summer Olympics
Minnesota Timberwolves players
Obras Sanitarias basketball players
Olympic bronze medalists for the United States in basketball
Omaha Racers players
Point guards
Rapid City Thrillers players
Rockford Lightning players
Undrafted National Basketball Association players
United States men's national basketball team players
United States Basketball League players